The 2012 Conwy Council election took place on 3 May 2012 to elect members of Conwy County Borough Council in Wales. It was on the same day as other 2012 United Kingdom local elections. The previous elections took place on 1 May 2008 and the next elections took place on 4 May 2017.

Overview

|}

[a] Includes Betws yn Rhos councillor who did not declare his affiliation at the election

Results

(*) represents a candidate running from previous election.
(~) represents an equivalent to a previous candidate.

Abergele and Pensarn

Kinmel Bay/Bae Cinmel

Betws-y-Coed

Betws yn Rhos

Bryn

Caerhun

Capelulo

Colwyn

Conwy

* = sitting councillor prior to the election

By-elections between 2012–2015

Betws yn Rhos (2014)
Resignation of Independent Cllr Ahmed Jalil.

References

2012 Welsh local elections
2012